"Back Here" is the debut single by English pop rock band BBMak. It was written by the three members of the group (Christian Burns, Mark Barry, and Stephen McNally) along with songwriter Phil Thornalley. It was originally released in August 1999 as the lead single from their debut studio album, Sooner or Later (2000), but did not experience commercial success until its American release the following year, when it became a top-20 hit in the United States. The song was then re-released in the United Kingdom and entered the top five of the UK Singles Chart in February 2001. Rolling Stone ranked it as the 63rd greatest boy band song of all time.

Content
Stephen McNally told Billboard that the song was deceiving due to its uptempo guitar part and the song sounding happy. He went on to say that it was about a "guy and a girl getting together, then the girl leaves the guy and now he can't live without her." Of the song's background, Christian Burns said "['Back Here'] came together really quickly. We were having coffee with Phil [Thornalley] at his flat, and we were just messing around with chords; we wrote the whole song in about 45 minutes'". Burns added, “I remember when we heard that guitar intro for the first time. We flew over to Hollywood to go and work on the record in the Hills with [producers] John Shanks and Oliver Leiber, walked into the studio and the intro was on loop. We all looked at each other and knew something magical was cooking here".

Release
Originally released in the United Kingdom on 16 August 1999, it reached number 37 on the UK Singles Chart that same month. Japanese radio stations eventually began playing the song which resulted in their overseas label Telstar scrambling to get the group to Asia for promotion. The song subsequently topped the charts of several Asian countries.

In the United States, "Back Here" was released on 27 March 2000 and eventually reached number 13 on the US Billboard Hot 100. It became a mainstay on pop radio and on the MTV show Total Request Live in the summer of 2000. The song also charted in Canada, peaking at number 11 on the RPM Top Singles chart. On 12 February 2001, following the song's success in America, the single was re-released in the United Kingdom and made the top 10 this time around, debuting and peaking at number five.

Music videos
There are two versions of the video. The first, made for a UK release, was filmed in Los Angeles and directed by Dani Jacobs. The second version, intended for a US release, was again directed by Jacobs and was filmed in London in March 2000. It features the band performing on the platform of Canary Wharf DLR station and in the London Eye as they try to earn the attention of a girl who passes by and gives them a tip near the end of the video.

Track listings

UK CD1 (1999)
 "Back Here"
 "Back Here" (extended version)
 "Back Here" (video)

UK CD2 (1999)
 "Back Here"
 "Miss You More"
 "More Than Words"

US CD single (2000)
 "Back Here" – 3:38
 "Miss You More" – 5:08
 "I'm Not in Love" / "Next Time" / "I Can Tell" – 2:46

US cassette single (2000)
A1. "Back Here" – 3:38
A2. "I'm Not in Love" / "Next Time" / "I Can Tell" – 2:46
B1. "Miss You More" – 5:06

European CD single (2001)
 "Back Here 2001" – 3:41
 "Back Here" (acoustic version) – 3:39

UK enhanced CD single (2001)
 "Back Here 2001"
 "Back Here" (acoustic version)
 "More Than Words"
 Enhanced CD-ROM

Credits and personnel
Credits are adapted from the UK CD1 liner notes.

Locations
 Recorded at Hollywood Studios (Hollywood, California)
 Mixed at Royaltone Studios (California)
 Artwork designed at Blade

BBMak
 Christian Burns – writing
 Mark Barry – writing
 Steven McNally – writing

Additional musicians
 John Shanks – guitars, production
 Mark Browne – bass
 Matt Laug – drums

Other personnel
 Phil Thornalley – writing
 Oliver Leiber – production
 Barry Rudolph – engineering
 Marc DeSisto – mixing
 Mark Jolley – A&R direction
 Norman Watson – photography
 Nick Foss – styling
 Rachel Howarth – make up

Charts

Weekly charts

Year-end charts

Release history

References

External links
 Single release info at discogs.com
 Lyrics of this song at Lyrics.com

1999 songs
1999 debut singles
BBMak songs
Hollywood Records singles
Songs written by Christian Burns
Songs written by Phil Thornalley
Telstar Records singles
Torch songs